Silvana Imam (pronounced , born  Plungė, Lithuania 19 September 1986) is a Swedish rapper. She is known for her political songs protesting racism, homophobia, and the Sweden Democrats.

Biography

Early life 
Imam's mother is from Lithuania and of Samogitian descent, while her father is of Syrian descent. She grew up in Plungė, Lithuania, and Stockholm. Imam has an academic background and has studied English and psychology at the University of Stockholm. Imam is openly lesbian and in a relationship with singer Beatrice Eli. She is a member of the hiphop collective RMH. RMH consists of rappers Erik "Eboi" Lundin and Cherrie.

Career 
In 2012, she was nominated for Newcomer of the Year at Kingsizegalan, and in May 2013, she released her debut album called Rekviem for the record label Playground Music. In May 2014, she released the EP När du ser mig • Se dig, and, after that went on her Jag ser dig tour in Sweden during the summer of 2014.

In January 2015, Imam signed with Sebastian Ingrosso's record label, Refune Music. In February 2015, she was named Homo of the Year at the QX Gaygalan Awards. In April 2015, she released her second EP, called Jag dör för dig, and went on her second tour, called Jag är naturkraft. Imam is in a relationship with performer Beatrice Eli and in June 2015, the couple performed together in Gothenburg under the stage name of Vierge Moderne. They got the name for their duo from a poem of the Finnish poet Edith Södergran. They performed at the performance stage at Liseberg. She was a guest in the premiere episode of the discussion show Edit: Dirawi, with Gina Dirawi as presenter. In October 2015, Imam was a guest on the Aftonbladet TV show "Nästa Nivå" (Next Level), where she discussed rap music with rap artist Sebbe Staxx. In February 2015, she won the award for Best Live Act at Manifestgalan. Silvana Imam has described herself in her lyrics as the Vincent van Gogh of rap, the Liberace of rap, and the Quentin Tarantino of rap. 
In October 2016, Silvana Imam was confirmed to play at the 31st edition of Eurosonic Noorderslag in Groningen, the Netherlands. On 2 July 2021, Imam and  will release "Vinner med hjärtat", the theme song for Sweden for the 2020 Summer Olympics. She made her acting debut in the 2022 film Dogborn, which premiered at the  International Critics' Week section of the 79th Venice International Film Festival.

Discography

Albums

References

External links 

Living people
1986 births
LGBT rappers
Swedish LGBT singers
Swedish lesbian musicians
Singers from Stockholm
Stockholm University alumni
Swedish women rappers
Swedish-language singers
Swedish people of Lithuanian descent
Swedish people of Syrian descent
20th-century Swedish LGBT people
21st-century Swedish LGBT people
Musikförläggarnas pris winners